Bandhanam is a 1978 Indian Malayalam film, directed by M. T. Vasudevan Nair and produced by V. B. K. Menon. The film stars Shobha, Sukumaran, Sankaradi and Shubha in the lead roles. The film has musical score by M. B. Sreenivasan. The film observes a young man's return from city living to the village. The film's mood is sorrowful. He leads a very wayward life and tries not to get himself attached to family ties but eventually gets drawn into the bondage of relationships and family by his step sister.

The title of the film literally translates to "bondage". The title is taken from a short story of the same name by MT although the film is not an adaptation the story.

Plot

Unnikrishnan works as clerk in the city. He leads an aimless life spending his evenings drinking and nights in a budget lodge. His colleague Sarojini has feelings for Unnikrishnan. Though Unnikrishnan reciprocates the feelings, he fails to express it to her.

Unnikrishnan  receives a mail from his estranged stepmother which prompts Unnikrishnan to take a month leave and go back to his village. He meets his stepmother and half sister Thankam, who are financially struggling.  Unnikrishnan arranges a suitable wedding for Thankam. After the wedding, he decides to go back to the city and propose to Sarojini, but he receives Sarojini's wedding invitation at the same time.  The story ends with Unnikrishnan deciding to continue his lonely life.

Cast
 
Shobha as Thankam 
Sukumaran as Unnikrishnan 
Sankaradi as Achummaan 
Shubha as Sarojini 
Nilambur Balan as Kaaranavar 
Janardanan 
Kunchan 
Kunjandi as Sankara Menon 
P. K. Abraham 
Santhakumari as Office Colleague 
Thrissur Elsy as Ammini 
Veeran

Soundtrack
The music was composed by M. B. Sreenivasan and the lyrics was written by O. N. V. Kurup.

References

External links
 
 see this film, bandhanam(1984)''

1978 films
1970s Malayalam-language films
Films scored by M. B. Sreenivasan
Films with screenplays by M. T. Vasudevan Nair
Films directed by M. T. Vasudevan Nair